The Congo Fed Cup team represents the Republic of the Congo in Fed Cup tennis competition and are governed by the Fédération Congolaise de Tennis.  They have not competed since 1992.

History
Congo competed in its first (and thus far, only) Fed Cup in 1992, losing both of its ties.

See also
Fed Cup
Congo Davis Cup team

External links

Billie Jean King Cup teams
Fed Cup
Fed Cup